Down in the Bunker is the third studio album by the Steve Gibbons Band. The album was produced by Tony Visconti. The reissue tracks were produced by Bobby Priden, who is best known for working with The Who.

The song "Any Road Up" did not appear on the band's earlier-released album of the same title.

Track listing
All tracks composed by Steve Gibbons
"No Spitting On the Bus"   
"Any Road Up"   
"Down in the Bunker"    
"Big J.C."  
"Mary Ain't Goin' Home"    
"Down in the City"    
"Let's Do It Again"  
"Eddy Vortex"  
"Chelita"    
"When You Get Outside"   
"Grace"

1988 Reissue tracks
All tracks composed by Steve Gibbons except where stated
"Tulane" (Chuck Berry)   
"Gold Coast"    
"Body Talk"   
"Let Me Go"    
"Satisfying Moves" (R. Ireson, Trevor Ireson)
"I Am Here"  
"The Great Escape"    
"Get Up and Dance"

Personnel
The Steve Gibbons Band
Steve Gibbons - acoustic guitar, electric guitar, rhythm guitar, harmonica, vocals 
Trevor Burton - bass, piano, vocals, backing vocals 
Bob Wilson - electric guitar, electric piano, bass, Moog synthesizer, acoustic guitar, organ, 12-string guitar, backing vocals 
Bob Lamb - drums, percussion
with:
Nick Pentelow - saxophone
Tony Visconti - bass
Dave Carroll - fiddle, lap steel guitar, backing vocals
Harry Rix - drums
Robbie Blunt - guitar
Technical
John Shaw - cover photography

References

External links
 1978 LP on Discogs.com
 1988 CD on Discogs.com

1978 albums
Albums produced by Tony Visconti
Polydor Records albums